Rayanapadu is a residential hub located in western part of Vijayawada in the Indian state of Andhra Pradesh. It falls under Vijayawada Rural mandal in Vijayawada revenue division of NTR district. Guntupalli Railway Wagon Workshop is located at a distance of 3.5 km from here. There is a proposal to merge this place into Vijayawada Municipal Corporation (VMC) to form a Greater Vijayawada Municipal Corporation.

Demographics 

 census, the village had a population of 3,504. The total population constitute, 1,742 males, 1,762 females and  323 children in the age group of 0–6 years. The sex ratio stands at 1012 females per 1000 males and the average literacy rate is 79.13% with 2,517 literates, significantly higher than the state average of 67.41%.

Transport 

It lies on the Kazipet–Vijayawada section.

See also 
Vijayawada (rural) mandal

References

Villages in NTR district
Neighbourhoods in Vijayawada